Hamyari Shahrdari Zanjan BC is an Iranian professional basketball club based in Zanjan, Iran. They compete in the Iranian Basketball Super League. In the 2012–13 Iranian Basketball Super League season they finished fourth in standings.

Resources

External links
 
 
 
 

Basketball teams in Iran
Zanjan County